Thornton, or Thornton by Horncastle, is a small hamlet in the civil parish of Roughton, in the East Lindsey district of Lincolnshire, England.

The village is mentioned in the 1086 Domesday Book, with 19 households and Robert the Bursar as Lord of the Manor.

The greenstone parish church is dedicated to Saint Wilfrid and is a Grade II listed building dating from the 15th century and restored in 1890 by Ewan Christian.

References

External links

Hamlets in Lincolnshire
East Lindsey District